The Minister of Foreign Affairs is the head of the Ministry of Foreign Affairs in Italy. The office was one of the positions which Italy inherited from the Kingdom of Sardinia where it was the most ancient ministry of the government: this origin gives to the office a ceremonial primacy in the Italian cabinet.

The current minister is Antonio Tajani, a member of Forza Italia, who is serving in the government of Giorgia Meloni since 22 October 2022.

Kingdom of Italy
 Parties

 

Coalitions

Italian Republic
 Parties

Coalitions:

Timeline

Kingdom of Italy

Italian Republic

References

See also
 Affari Esteri
 Foreign policy

Foreign
Main
1861 establishments in Italy